Harry DeBoer (1903–1992) was an American labor militant and Trotskyist. He was born in Crookston, Minnesota, and worked in the Minneapolis coal yards. DeBoer became one of the leaders of the Minneapolis Teamsters Strike of 1934a particularly well-organized action that resulted in the shutting down of most commercial transport in the city. A leading member of the Socialist Workers Party, DeBoer was imprisoned together with many other SWP leaders under the Smith Act for opposing the US involvement in World War II. In 1987, DeBoer authored the essay "How to Win Strikes: Lessons from the 1934 Minneapolis Truckers Strike" (also translated into Danish and German), in which he sought to disseminate the tactics used in the Minneapolis strike for the benefit of a new generation of socialists.

In his later years, DeBoer was a member of the Committee for a Workers' International before the 1992 split.

Notes

External links 
 
 Hvordan strejker vindes (HOW TO WIN STRIKES in Danish) by Harry DeBoer
 Speech at 1985 Militant Rally

1903 births
1992 deaths
People from Crookston, Minnesota
Minnesota socialists
Members of the Socialist Workers Party (United States)
People convicted under the Smith Act